The 1904 Grand National was the 66th renewal of the Grand National horse race that took place at Aintree Racecourse near Liverpool, England, on 25 March 1904.

The winner, Moifaa, was the first ever non-British/Irish winner of the race. He ran in the 
race again the following year, when he was owned by the King.

Finishing Order

Non-finishers

Media Coverage and Aftermath
Shortly after his victory, a story emerged from the United States that the Grand National winner had come to England, the survivor of a ship wreck. The popularity of the story of the Robinson Crusoe Grand National winner gained weight through the decades and has been retold many times in books and on television regarding the race, with some versions telling of super equine feats of fifty mile swims to safety. While Moifaa is known to have sailed from Australia to England without incident, the story is not totally without a grain of truth as another New Zealand bred competitor in the 1904 National, Kiora had indeed been shipwrecked on its way to England. The horse had swum nearly half a mile through stormy seas to a reef before being rescued in a very exhausted state the following day.

References

 1904
Grand National
Grand National
20th century in Lancashire